Currants (Ribes species) are used as food plants by the larvae of a number of Lepidoptera species:

Monophagous
Species which feed exclusively on Ribes

 Geometridae
Spinach (Eulithis mellinata)

Polyphagous
Species which feed on Ribes and other plants

 Arctiidae
Buff ermine (Spilosoma luteum)
 Geometridae
Brimstone moth (Opisthograptis luteolata)
Common emerald (Hemithea aestivaria)
Currant pug (Eupithecia assimilata)
Engrailed (Ectropis crepuscularia) - recorded on redcurrant (R. rubrum)
Juniper pug (Eupithecia pusillata) - recorded on redcurrant (R. rubrum)
Mottled beauty (Alcis repandata)
Mottled pug (Eupithecia exiguata) - recorded on redcurrant (R. rubrum)
Mottled umber (Erannis defoliaria)
Scalloped hazel (Odontopera bidentata)
Scalloped oak (Crocallis elinguaria)
Winter moth (Operophtera brumata)
 Hepialidae
Common swift (Korscheltellus lupulina)
 Lymantriidae
Brown-tail (Euproctis chrysorrhoea)
 Noctuidae
Dot moth (Melanchra persicariae)
Dun-bar (Cosmia trapezina)
Grey chi (Antitype chi) - recorded on blackcurrant (R. nigrum)
Hebrew character (Orthosia gothica)
Mouse moth (Amphipyra tragopoginis) - recorded on redcurrant (R. rubrum)
Satellite (Eupsilia transversa) - recorded on redcurrant (R. rubrum)
Setaceous Hebrew character (Xestia c-nigrum)
Small angle shades (Euplexia lucipara)

External links 

Currants
Ribes